Philomon Baffour (born 6 February 2001) is a Ghanaian professional footballer who plays as a right-back for Ghanaian Premier league side Dreams FC and the Ghana National Team.

Career 
Baffour played the full 90 minutes in 3–0 win against West African Football Academy on 3 February 2021. He was part of the final 28-man squad named by Milovan Rajevac for the 2021 Africa Cup of Nations (AFCON) in Cameroon.

References 

Living people
2001 births
Ghanaian footballers
Association football defenders
Dreams F.C. (Ghana) players
Ghana youth international footballers